LHS 3844 is a red dwarf star located  away from the Solar System in the constellation of Indus. The star has about 15% the mass and 19% the radius of the Sun. It is a relatively inactive red dwarf with a slow rotation period of about 128 days, though UV flares have been observed. LHS 3844 is orbited by one known exoplanet.

Planetary system 

The exoplanet LHS 3844 b was discovered in 2018 using TESS. It is a terrestrial planet larger than Earth with an orbital period of less than a day, and likely does not have an atmosphere. Its low albedo suggests that its surface may resemble that of the Moon or Mercury.

In August 2022, this planetary system was included among 20 systems to be named by the third NameExoWorlds project.

References 

Indus (constellation)
M-type main-sequence stars
Planetary systems with one confirmed planet
0136